"Hasta Mañana" (Spanish for "Until tomorrow") is the fourth track on Swedish pop group ABBA's second studio album, Waterloo. It was released in 1974 as the album's third and final single.

Background
Initially fearing that "Waterloo" might be too risky to enter for the 1974 Eurovision Song Contest, the group considered performing the ballad "Hasta Mañana" instead, as they thought that it was more in style with previous Eurovision winners. Eventually, they decided on "Waterloo", primarily because it featured Agnetha Fältskog and Anni-Frid Lyngstad sharing lead vocals, whereas "Hasta Mañana" had Fältskog as the sole lead vocalist. ABBA believed that this would give the wrong impression of them to the world.

The song was still known under its original working title "Who's Gonna Love You?" when the backing track was recorded. The lyrics were later written by Stig Anderson while on a Christmas holiday to the Canary Islands and dictated over the telephone.

While the song was being recorded, they decided to give up on it at one point because none of them could sing it properly.  Agnetha alone was in the studio and decided to play around with it.  She felt if she could sing it in a Connie Francis style it would work — and it did.

In Australia, "Hasta Mañana" was used as a B-side on the "So Long" single (which never charted). After being featured in the popular The Best of ABBA TV Special, broadcast in March 1976, the song was re-released and became a Top 20 hit in Australia and Top 10 hit in New Zealand.

It reached number 2 on the charts in South Africa in November 1974.

Charts

The Boones cover

Cover versions
 A recording by ABBA featuring Polar Music artist Lena Andersson on lead vocals was a 1974 Svensktoppen hit, as well as a cover version by dance band Schytts the same year. Lena Andersson also recorded German and Swedish language versions of the song, all using the original ABBA backing track.  This recording was a Swedish #1 single in 1975.
 In 1975, Polish singer Anna Jantar recorded a Polish version titled "Hasta Maniana".
 In 1975, Australian singer Judy Stone released her own recording as a single.
 in 1975, Hong Kong singer Amina 阿美娜 recorded a Cantonese version titled "Hasta Manana 情莫變".
 In 1977, the song was covered by American singer Debby Boone.  It was the B-side to her single "You Light Up My Life", which hit #1 on the US charts for an unprecedented (at the time) 10 consecutive weeks.  Benny and Bjorn indicated that they made more money off her cover than even "Dancing Queen" because Boone's song was a major international hit, and both A and B sides were paid royalties. Her cover, a duet with her father Pat Boone, was an Adult Contemporary hit in the United States (#32) and Canada (#37).
 In 1978, a Swedish country band called Nashville Train (which included some of ABBA's own backing band members) covered the song on their album ABBA Our Way.
 In 1979, Czech singer Helena Blehárová recorded a Czech version titled „Dáváš mi tisíc něžných příběhů“ to TV movie „Dostaveníčko s písničkou“. 
 In 1984, Hong Kong singer Sally Yeh covered this song in Cantonese.
 In 1989, Swedish dansband Vikingarna released a version that became a Svensktoppen hit.
 In 1992, Swedish dance group Army of Lovers released a version on the Swedish compilation ABBA - The Tribute. This cover was also included on the 1999 album ABBA: A Tribute - The 25th Anniversary Celebration.
 In 1996, Belgian girl group Sha-Na recorded a dance version with Dutch lyrics that was released as a single.
 In 1998, Spanish band Los Grey's recorded a Spanish version for their album Cosa De Locos.

References

External links
 
 

1970s ballads
1974 songs
1974 singles
1977 singles
ABBA songs
Debby Boone songs
Lena Andersson songs
Macaronic songs
Polydor Records singles
Warner Records singles
Pop ballads
Songs written by Benny Andersson and Björn Ulvaeus
Songs written by Stig Anderson
Spanish-language songs
Vikingarna (band) songs